Hobbs Municipal Ice Center is an indoor ice arena complex located in Eau Claire, Wisconsin. The arena is home to the UW–Eau Claire Blugolds men's and women's varsity hockey teams, in addition to the and men's club hockey team. The arena also hosts local high school teams. The facility provides three ice rinks, locker rooms, meeting rooms and offices for the Eau Claire Parks, Recreation & Forestry Department.

The Hobbs Municipal Ice Center was built in 1974 with an initial donation from the Hobbs Foundation. A $5.6 million renovation was completed in early-2010, adding additional office space, a third rink, additional seats, a training room, new lighting, and more.

The Eau Claire Figure Skating Club and the Eau Claire Youth Hockey Association also use the arena.

The main rink is the Richard O'Brien Rink, named in honor of Richard O'Brien, who was the driving force behind the community effort that led to the construction of the ice center in 1975.

External links
 City of Eau Claire Hobbs Municipal Ice Center page

References 

Buildings and structures in Eau Claire, Wisconsin
Sports venues in Wisconsin
Sports in Eau Claire, Wisconsin
Indoor ice hockey venues in Wisconsin
University of Wisconsin–Eau Claire
1975 establishments in Wisconsin
Sports venues completed in 1975
College ice hockey venues in the United States